MAVTV (originally known as Maverick Television) is an American cable and satellite television channel owned by the automotive lubricant company Lucas Oil, a ubiquitous presence in the motorsports world, which mainly airs programming focused around motorsports and programming for automotive enthusiasts. CJ Olivares serves as the network's interim president.

History
MAVTV launched on October 1, 2004 based out of Atlanta with distribution limited to select cable companies, with the name a shortening of Maverick Television (the network's name at launch). The network was privately held and founded by four former executives from Showtime Networks—Steve Severn, Steve Smith, Doug Jost, Rob Stevens. It had no connections to the NBA's Dallas Mavericks or Mark Cuban, their owner, nor to Maverick Television, a British reality television production company owned by All3Media.

Purchase by Lucas Oil and change of programming direction
In October 2011, longtime partner lubricants company Lucas Oil purchased Maverick Television; the company had provided and sponsored most of the network's motorsports rights even before their purchase, and the network was likely to go dark without the purchase as programming rights had deteriorated towards barter programming and heavy repeats of library content. The network was quickly reformatted away by the new management from a completely male focus featuring lowbrow comedies, low-tier male targeting programming and Canadian content dramas with low cost purchase rights, and late night shows featuring women in bikini shoots towards a general family programming direction.

On July 4, 2012, Lucas re-branded the network, shortening the name to MAVTV (now all capitalized), but with the MAV initials standing for "Movies, Action, and Variety" with the addition of films and more concert programming to the schedule, and a gradual drawdown of racing-related programming to a smaller, yet important part of the schedule to maintain its cable carriage mainly among digital sports tiers, including the Lucas Oil Off Road Racing Series and the Lucas Oil Pro Pulling League. The network is also advertised on the containers of many Lucas Oil products.

Until 2015, the network also aired classic programmings such as The Lone Ranger, Starsky & Hutch, and Bonanza, along with films. However, the recovery of the network's revenues under Lucas Oil, along with heavy competition in the classic television rights race from digital over-the-air networks such as MeTV, Antenna TV and movie networks like Movies! and getTV meant that the network began to draw down non-motorsports programming by the start of 2016. The conversion of Fox's Speed to the general-interest Fox Sports 1 also left a plethora of motorsports rights for other networks to pick up, which MAVTV took advantage of. The network also carries motorboat racing and various events from the Federation of International Motorcycling, including ice speedway and motorcycle speedway events.

Past programming
The network's 1080i high definition feed was launched during the fall of 2008. The standard definition version of the network is downscaled from the HD master feed at the cable operator's headend level.

Before Lucas Oil took over full management of the network, MAVTV carried programming such as the second season of Rad Girls, SpeedFreaks, Women's Flat Track Roller Derby, American Tailgater, AMA Motorcycle Racing, Wrestlicious TakeDown, Ultimate Combat Experience, Bikini AllStars and Best of the Best. In addition, MAVTV presented the male-specific documentary series Manumentaries. Except for existing Lucas Oil programming and the AMA, none of this programming currently remains on the network's schedule. Overnights had been filled by music video/interactive SMS programming from NOYZ via a time brokerage agreement before that company went bankrupt in early 2008.

Sports deals

In 2007, MAVTV struck a deal with the Women's Flat Track Derby Association to broadcast two of the three roller derby finals: the Eastern Regional Tournament (Heartland Havoc, which was broadcast as a series of one-hour weekly episodes) and the National Championships (Texas Shootout).

MAVTV contracted with the Automobile Racing Club of America, the auto racing sanctioning body, to air at least 6 races in 2008, including both 100-mile dirt races at the Illinois State Fairgrounds in Springfield, and the Southern Illinois State Fairgrounds in DuQuoin. SpeedFreaks hosts Kenny Sargent and Crash Gladys also appeared on episodes of the Lucas Motorsports hour.

MAVTV sponsored the MAVTV 500, the final race in the 2012 season of the IndyCar Series, which took place at the Auto Club Speedway in Fontana, California.

MAVTV is partnered with King of the Cage, broadcasting their live and past Martial Arts events, as well as Championship Wrestling From Hollywood.

MAVTV did their 1st live motorsports event, the Lucas Oil Challenge Cup featuring the Lucas Oil Off Road Racing Series on October 27, 2013 from Lake Elsinore Motorsports Park. They will also do live coverage of the Lucas Oil Chili Bowl Nationals, one of the biggest midget car races every year. The East Bay Winter Nationals from the Lucas Oil Late Model Dirt Series and all Moto1 rounds of the Lucas Oil AMA Pro Motorcross championship in 2014. They will also cover several King of the Cage MMA events live in 2014.

In 2014, MAVTV partnered with professional road racing series Pirelli World Challenge to air the Pirelli World Challenge Touring Car Championship.

In 2017, MAVTV signed a multi year deal with ARCA Racing to bring almost all their races live or broadcast at later time/date.  Outside the races broadcast from Fox Sports.

In 2018, Signed a deal to show highlights of Tony Stewart All Star Circuit of Champions Also MAVTV expanded it coverage of ARCA Racing with 11 of its 12 races broadcasting live

In 2019, MAVTV is showing all of its ARCA races its broadcast live for the first time

Movie deals
On April 27, 2010, MAVTV signed a deal with Sony Pictures giving them access to select titles from Sony's film library.  The deal was part of MAVTV's programming strategy to expand its schedule and abandon their former all-male programming direction. The network added films from the Warner Bros. library in July 2012. These deals eventually expired though as mentioned above, and MAVTV eventually went to an all-motorsports schedule by the start of 2016.

Personnel
Key people at MAVTV include:
 CJ Olivares, Interim President of MAVTV
 Scott McLemore, Director of Production & Programming
 Mark Carter, Director of Sales & Marketing

Carriage
MAVTV can be found in the US on Cablevision, Spectrum, GCI in Alaska, select cable systems within the Caribbean Co-op, Xfinity, RCN Corporation, AT&T U-verse and DirecTV.

As per an email sent to its subscribers, Verizon FiOS removed the channel from its TV service along with Youtoo TV, Blue Highways TV, and Black Belt TV as of December 31, 2012, making it available as an "On Demand" service. However, the channel returned to Verizon FiOS on June 10, 2014.

DirecTV added MAVTV on June 10, 2013. The channel is carried in standard definition and high definition.

MAVTV Canada was launched in January, 2017 in a partnership with the Neon Star Sports & Entertainment Inc, which produces Canadian content.

Dish Network previously carried MAVTV in high definition from May 8, 2009 to May 12, 2015. Dish dropped the channel as MAVTV and its parent company Lucas Oil failed to reach a new agreement to continue carrying the channel.

FuboTV was added in March 2018 with Sportsman Channel, Outdoor Channel, World Fishing Network, Outside TV and till late October motorsports.tv to the Adventure Plus Package.

A free version of MAVTV, branded "MAVTV Select," provides a selection of MAVTV's programming through advertising-supported over-the-top media services Pluto TV, Stirr, The Roku Channel and Plex, among others.

Programming

Motorsports coverage
 Acceleration (2014–present)
 ARCA Menards Series (2008, 2015, 2017–2022)
 Nashville round shown on tape delay in 2015
 Lucas Oil ASCS Sprint Car Series
 Lucas Oil Chili Bowl Nationals presented by General Tire (2014–present)
 Saturday night alphabet mains are featured live.
 INEX Legends Cars & Bandolero Cars (2014–present)
 Bojangles Summer Shootout at Charlotte Motor Speedway has aired on the network since 2014.
 A part of the Acceleration 2014 coverage, the Legend SuperCup was aired on the network
 Knoxville Raceway's Dirt Dreams (2014–present)
 Lucas Oil Late Model Dirt Series
 live coverage of the East Bay Winter Nationals
 Lucas Oil Modified Series
 The 2013 Lucas Oil Challenge Cup was live on the network, it was the network's first live race. The series did not feature live coverage in 2014 however.
 Lucas Oil Pro Pulling League
 Lucas Oil POWRI Midgets
 the 2013 & 2014 Jason Leffler Memorial from Wayne County Speedway was covered on Dirty 30
 Other races such as DuQuoin from 2014 will be covered on Lucas Oil On The Edge
 NEMA Midgets
 The 2014 Boston Louie Seymour Memorial at Seekonk was featured with full race coverage on the SPEED SPORT program. 
 Monster Jam (2023-present)
 26 Stadium Championship Series episodes
 20 Arena in 30 episodes
 40 Inside Monster Jam episodes
 Novelis Supermodifieds
 2 to 3 races from the 2014 season at Oswego Speedway were shown on MavTV under the SPEED SPORT program. Those races included the Budweiser International Classic & the Jim Shampine Memorial
 Outlaw kart racing
 The network featured the SPEED SPORT Challenge at Millbridge Speedway on the SPEED SPORT program in 2014 and 2015.
 SRL Spears Southwest Tour (2014–present)
 The 2014 races at Irwindale & The Bullring at LVMS were aired.
 Super DIRTcar Series (2015)
 The round at Rolling Wheels in 2015 was shown on the network
 The Dirt (2014–present)
 The Dirt features the weekly divisions at WXC Speedway at Western Springs. 
 USAC Silver Crown Series (2015–present)
 Sulmar Classic @ Terre Haute to be shown, a part of the JackSlash Dirty 30 program.
 USAC AMSOIL National Sprint Cars (2014–present)
 several rounds from the 2014 season were featured on the JackSlash Dirty 30 program. Those include the Kokomo Sprint Car Smackdown, Oval Nationals @ Perris and the season finale at Canyon.
 USAC Honda National Midget Championship (2014–present)
 several rounds from the 2014 and 2015 seasons were featured on the JackSlash Dirty 30 program.
 World of Outlaws Sprint Cars (2014–present)
 The FVP Knoxville Nationals presented by Lucas Oil have been aired on the network on a tape delay basis since 2014.

 Road racing

 Kuhmo Tyres V8 Touring Car Series
 Pirelli World Challenge (2013, 2014)
 TC rounds aired originally on the network, GT/GTA/GTS races from the 2014 season were re-aired on the network afterwards.

 Drag racing

 ANDRA Drag Racing Series (2014–present)
 FIA European Drag Racing Championship

 Drifting

 Australian Drifting Grand Prix (2014–present)
 British Drift Championship
 D1NZ

 Off-road racing

 Best In The Desert
 Lucas Oil Off Road Racing Series
 World Rally Championship (2013–present)
 live coverage of several stages started in 2014

 Motorcycling

 ATVMX National Championship (2014–present)
 AMA Endurocross
 Australasian Superbike Championship (2014–present)
 British Motocross Championship
 Lucas Oil AMA Pro Motocross Championship 
 Sidecar World Championship
 GEICO Motorcycle Superbike Shootout
 FIM Supermoto World Championship
 FIM X-Trial World Championship
 Ice Speedway Gladiators
 Superprestigio Dirt Track
 The Superprestigio Dirt Track Barcelona 2014 was featured with full race coverage on the SPEED SPORT program in 2014.

 Boat racing

 American Sprint Boat Racing Association
 Lucas Oil Drag Boat Racing Series
 Powerboat P1 SuperStock Championship
 V8 Superboats

Motorsport highlight and reality shows
 Dirty 30/Pavement 30/Jackslash.com
 Lucas Oil Motorsports Hour
 Lucas Oil On the Edge
 SPEED SPORT
 SPEED SPORT Magazine
 The Dave Despain Show
 The Motocross Files
 MotorWeek

References

External links

Television channels and stations established in 2004
English-language television stations in the United States
Sports television networks in the United States
Companies based in Corona, California
Men's interest channels
Lucas Oil